An Abaadeh carpet is a type of Persian carpet made in the town of Abadeh in Iran.

History
The rugs are named after the city of Abadeh, halfway between Isfahan and Shiraz in Iran, where these rugs are made.

Design
The rugs often feature a large diamond pattern in the centre, with smaller ones in the corners also.

References

Persian rugs and carpets